Derrew is a village located near the Partry Mountains in County Mayo, Ireland.

Local residents
Sean na Sagart, born Sean O'Mullowny, a notorious priest hunter in County Mayo during the early 18th century.

See also
  List of towns and villages in Ireland

Towns and villages in County Mayo
Articles on towns and villages in Ireland possibly missing Irish place names